Li'l Abner: The Complete Dailies & Color Sundays, also known as The Complete Li'l Abner, is a series collecting the American comic strip Li'l Abner written and drawn by Al Capp, originally distributed by the syndicate United Feature Syndicate and later by Chicago Tribune New York News Syndicate, in total during 43 years before the strip ended. The strip debuted in August 1934 and at its peak, it had an estimated readership of over 60 million people regularly. The collection is published by The Library of American Comics.

Background

On January 26, 2010, The Library of American Comics announced that their next reprint series would be a collection of Al Capp's Li'l Abner, the first volume of the series' was planned to be released in April the same year. This would be the comic strip's first reprint since Denis Kitchen and his Kitchen Sink Press' effort to publish the comic strip as a whole during the 1990s, this without a completion after the company going under.

However, LoAC's venture also ended with an incomplete run, as publication of further volumes ceased in 2017.

Dark Horse has later reprinted the years of the strip when Frank Frazetta assisted Capp on the strip.

Format

The hardcover volumes of the series' measure 9.25 x 12.5 inches, (235 mm × 318 mm), have 270 pages per book on average and come with a dust jacket. They contain the chronological daily strips in black-and-white and for the first time since the original newspaper publication the Sunday pages are reproduced in full color. The daily strips have a separate plot from the Sunday strips. Each volume contains approximately 700 strips.
The books are designed and edited by Dean Mullaney, feature biographical essays written by Bruce Canwell and introductions by Denis Kitchen. The collection also include the proto-Abner comic strip, Big Leviticus, which Al Capp created one year prior to Li'l Abners launch, this while he ghosted both writing and drawing on the other comic strip Joe Palooka for Ham Fisher.

Recognition

 2011 - The series was nominated for the Harvey Award in the category, "Best Domestic Reprint Project".

Volumes

{| class="wikitable sortable"
|+ style="background-color:#B0C4DE" | Volumes
|-
! style="background-color:#D0E4FE" data-sort-type="number" | Volume 
! style="background-color:#D0E4FE" | Release date
! style="background-color:#D0E4FE" | Title
! style="background-color:#D0E4FE" | Period
| style="background-color:#D0E4FE" | Page count'''
! style="background-color:#D0E4FE" | ISBN
|-
|1||2010-04-20||“Li'l Abner: The Complete Dailies & Color Sundays - Vol. 1”||1934–1936||288||
|-
|2||2010-11-30||“Li'l Abner: The Complete Dailies & Color Sundays - Vol. 2”||1937–1938||272||
|-
|3||2011-06-21||“Li'l Abner: The Complete Dailies & Color Sundays - Vol. 3”||1939–1940||272||
|-
|4||2012-02-07||“Li'l Abner: The Complete Dailies & Color Sundays - Vol. 4”||1941–1942||272||
|-
|5||2013-01-29||“Li'l Abner: The Complete Dailies & Color Sundays - Vol. 5”||1943–1944||272||
|-
|6||2013-12-24||“Li'l Abner: The Complete Dailies & Color Sundays - Vol. 6”||1945–1946||272||
|-
|7||2014-12-23||“Li'l Abner: The Complete Dailies & Color Sundays - Vol. 7”||1947–1948||272||
|-
|8||2016-05-10||“Li'l Abner: The Complete Dailies & Color Sundays - Vol. 8”||1949–1950||272||
|-
|9||2017-12-19||“Li'l Abner: The Complete Dailies & Color Sundays - Vol. 9”''||1951–1952||256||
|-
|}

References

External links 
 Publisher website - IDW Publishing - The Library of American Comics - Li'l Abner: The Complete Dailies & Color Sundays
 Preview - Li'l Abner: The Complete Dailies & Color Sundays - Vol. 8

Li'l Abner
1934 comics debuts
1977 comics endings
2010 comics debuts
Comic strip collection books
Comic strips set in the United States
Drama comics
Fantasy comics
Fictional hillbillies
Humor comics
Kentucky in fiction
The Library of American Comics publications
Satirical comics
Works about Appalachia